The Parkinson is a Thai pop, soul band formed in 2015 in Bangkok, Thailand under the label SPICY DISC.

The band is well known in Thailand for many Thai songs, such as "Tell Her That I love" ("จะบอกเธอว่ารัก"), "Dear Friend" ("เพื่อนรัก"). and Their music is very influenced by American blues.

Members
 Niphat Kamjornpreecha (Kan) – นิภัทร์ กำจรปรีชา (กานต์) : (Guitar, lead vocals)
 Natthawit Odaki (Toe) – ณัฐวิทย์ โอดาคิ (โต) :(Bassist, backing vocals)
 Arithat Kueajitkulanun (Beer) – อริย์ธัช เกื้อจิตกุลนันท์ (เบียร์) : (drums, backing vocals)

Discography

Album

References

External links
 official website 

Thai musical groups